

Events
Lanfranc Cigala writes  in response to the loss of Jerusalem to the Mamelukes
Guilhem Figueira writes  urging peace in Europe for a union against Islam after the fall of Jerusalem

Births
Folquet de Lunel (died 1300), troubadour from Lunel (in the modern department of Hérault)

Deaths

13th-century poetry
Poetry